Keltie Head is a rounded headland with vertical cliffs which rise to a small ice dome  high, forming the northwestern end of Vega Island, south of Trinity Peninsula, Antarctica. It was discovered by the Swedish Antarctic Expedition under Otto Nordenskiöld, 1901–04, and named by him for Sir John Scott Keltie, Secretary of the Royal Geographical Society, 1892–1915.

References

Headlands of Trinity Peninsula